The demography of Kenya is monitored by the Kenyan National Bureau of Statistics. Kenya is a multi-ethnic state in East Africa. Its total population was at 47 558,296 as of the 2019 census.

A national census was conducted in 1999, although the results were never released. A new census was undertaken in 2009, but turned out to be controversial, as the questions about ethnic affiliation seemed inappropriate after the ethnic violence of the previous year. Preliminary results of the census were published in 2010.

Kenya's population was reported as 47.6 million during the 2019 census compared to 38.6 million inhabitants 2009, 30.7 million in 1999, 21.4 million in 1989, and 15.3 million in 1979. This was an increase of a factor of 2.5 over 30 years, or an average growth rate of more than 3 percent per year. The population growth rate has been reported as reduced during the 2000s, and was estimated at 2.7 percent (as of 2010), resulting in an estimate of 46.5 million in 2016.

History

Ethnic groups

Kenya has a very diverse population that includes most major ethnic, racial and linguistic groups found in Africa. Bantu and Nilotic populations together constitute around 92% of the nation's inhabitants. People from Asian or European heritage living in Kenya are estimated at around 200,000.

Kenya's largest ethnic group is the Kikuyu. They make up less than a fifth of the population. Since Kenyan independence in 1963, Kenyan politics have been characterized by ethnic tensions and rivalry between the larger groups. This devolved into ethnic violence in the 2007–2008 Kenyan crisis.

In Kenya's last colonial census of 1962, population groups residing in the territory included European, African and Asian individuals. According to the Kenya National Bureau of Statistics, Kenya had a population of 47,564,296 by 2019. The largest native ethnic groups were the Kikuyu (8,148,668), Luhya (6,823,842), Kalenjin (6,358,113), Luo (5,066,966), Kamba (4,663,910), Somalis (2,780,502), Kisii (2,703,235), Mijikenda (2,488,691), Meru (1,975,869), Maasai (1,189,522), and Turkana (1,016,174). Foreign-rooted populations included Asians (90,527), Europeans (42,868) with Kenyan citizenship, 26,753 without, and Kenyan Arabs (59,021). The number of ethnic categories and sub-categories recorded in the census has changed significantly over time, expanding from 42 in 1969 to more than 120 in 2019.

Bantu peoples

Bantus are the single largest population division in Kenya. The term Bantu denotes widely dispersed but related peoples that speak south-central Niger–Congo languages. Originally from Cameroon-Nigeria border regions, Bantus began a millennium-long series of migrations referred to as the Bantu expansion that first brought them south into East Africa about 2,000 years ago.

Most Bantu are farmers. Some of the prominent Bantu groups in Kenya include the Kikuyu, the Kamba, the Luhya, the Kisii, the Meru, and the Mijikenda. The Swahili people are descended from Wangozi Bantu peoples that intermarried with Arab immigrants.

The Kikuyu, who are one of the biggest tribes in Kenya, seem to have assimilated a significant number of Cushitic speakers. Evidence from their Y DNA shows that 18% of Kikuyu carry the E1b1b Y DNA.

Nilotic peoples

Nilotes are the second-largest group of peoples in Kenya. They speak Nilo-Saharan languages and went south into  East Africa from Western Asia and North Africa by way of South Sudan. Most Nilotes in Kenya are historically pastoralists. The most prominent of these groups include the Luo, the Maasai, the Samburu, the Turkana, and the Kalenjin. As with the Bantu, some Nilotic systems of governance (such as Ibinda of the Nandi) bear similarities with those of their Cushitic neighbors (such as the Gada system of the Oromo).

Cushitic peoples

Cushitic peoples form a small minority of Kenya's population. They speak languages belonging to the Afroasiatic family and originally came from Ethiopia and Somalia. However, some large ethnic Somali clans are native to the area that used be known as NFD in Kenya. These people are not from Somalia but share the same ethnicity as the majority in Somalia. Most are herdsmen and have almost entirely adopted Islam. Cushites are concentrated in the northernmost North Eastern Province, which borders Somalia.

The Cushitic peoples are divided into two groups: the Southern Cushites and the Eastern Cushites.

The Southern Cushites were the second-earliest inhabitants of Kenya after the indigenous hunter-gatherer groups, and the first of the Cushitic-speaking peoples to migrate from their homeland in the Horn of Africa about 2,000 years ago. They were progressively displaced in a southerly direction or absorbed, or both, by the incoming Nilotic and Bantu groups until they wound up in Tanzania. There are no longer any Southern Cushites left in Kenya. (The Dahalo were originally pre-Cushitic peoples who adopted the language of their dominant Southern Cushitic neighbors sometime toward the last millennium BC.).
The Eastern Cushites include the Oromo and the Somali. After the Northern Frontier District (North Eastern Province) was handed over to Kenyan nationalists at the end of British colonial rule in Kenya, Somalis in the region fought the Shifta War against Kenyan troops to join their kin in the Somali Republic to the north. Although the war ended in a cease-fire, Somalis in the region still identify and maintain close ties with their kin in Somalia and see themselves as one people, since like most borders in Africa and Asia, national borders were arbitrarily drawn in colonial European countries, especially during the Scramble for Africa

An entrepreneurial community, they established themselves in the business sector, particularly in Eastleigh, Nairobi.

Indians

Asians living in Kenya are descended from South Asian migrants. Significant Asian migration to Kenya began between 1896 and 1901 when some 32,000 indentured labourers were recruited from British India to build the Kenya-Uganda Railway. The majority of Kenyan Asians hail from the Gujarat and Punjab regions. The community grew significantly during the colonial period, and in the 1962 census Asians made up a third of the population of Nairobi and consisted of 176,613 people across the country.

Since Kenyan independence large numbers have emigrated due to race-related tensions with the Bantu and Nilotic majority. Those that remain are principally concentrated in the business sector, and Asians continue to form one of the more prosperous communities in the region. According to the 2019 Census, Kenyan Asians number 47,555 people, while Asians without Kenyan citizenship number 42,972 individuals. In 2017, they were officially recognised as the 44th tribe of Kenya.

Europeans

Europeans in Kenya are primarily the descendants of British migrants during the colonial period, there is also a significant expat population of Europeans living in Kenya. Economically, virtually all Europeans in Kenya belong to the middle- and upper-middle-class. Nowadays, only a small minority of them are landowners (livestock and game ranchers, horticulturists and farmers), with the majority working in the tertiary sector: in air transport, finance, import, and hospitality. Apart from isolated individuals such as anthropologist and conservationist Richard Leakey, F.R.S., who died in 2022, Kenyan white people have virtually completely retreated from Kenyan politics, and are no longer represented in public service and parastatals, from which the last remaining staff from colonial times retired in the 1970s. According to the 2019 Census, Kenyan Europeans number 42,868 people, while Europeans without Kenyan citizenship number 26,753 individuals. 0.3% of the population of Kenya is from Asia or Europe.

Arabs
Arabs form a small but historically important minority ethnic group in Kenya. They are principally concentrated along the coast in cities such as Mombasa. A Muslim community, they primarily came from Oman and Hadhramaut in Yemen, and are engaged in trade. Arabs are locally referred to as Washihiri or, less commonly, as simply Shihiri in the Bantu Swahili language, Kenya's lingua franca. According to the 2019 Census, Kenyan Arabs number 59,021 people.

Languages

Kenya's various ethnic groups typically speak their mother tongues within their own communities. The two official languages, English and Swahili, serve as the main lingua franca between the various ethnic groups. English is widely spoken in commerce, schooling and government. Peri-urban and rural dwellers are less multilingual, with many in rural areas speaking only their native languages.

According to Ethnologue, there are a total of 69 languages spoken in Kenya. Most belong to two broad language families: Niger-Congo (Bantu branch) and Nilo-Saharan (Nilotic branch), which are spoken by the country's Bantu and Nilotic populations, respectively. The Cushitic and Arab ethnic minorities speak languages belonging to the separate Afro-Asiatic family, with the Indian and European residents speaking languages from the Indo-European family.

Population
The proportion of children below the age of 15 in 2010 was 42.5%, 54.9% between the ages of 15 and 65, and 2.7% was 65 years or older. Worldometers estimates the total population at 48,466,928 inhabitants, a 29th global rank.

Population by Sex and Age Group (Census 24.VIII.2009):

Population by Sex and Age Group (Census 24.VIII.2019):

Population by province in 2019 census

Population by census year

Fertility and Births (Demographic and Health Surveys)
Total Fertility Rate (TFR) (Wanted Fertility Rate) and Crude Birth Rate (CBR):

Fertility data as of 2014 (DHS Program):

UN population projections
Numbers are in thousands. UN medium variant projections
2015	46,332
2020	52,563
2025	59,054
2030	65,928
2035	73,257
2040	80,975
2045	88,907
2050	96,887

Vital statistics

Registration of vital events is in Kenya not complete. The Population Department of the United Nations prepared the following estimates.

Other population statistics
Demographic statistics according to the World Population Review in 2022.

One birth every 21 seconds	
One death every 2 minutes	
One net migrant every 53 minutes	
Net gain of one person every 26 seconds

The following demographic are from the CIA World Factbook unless otherwise indicated.

Population
55,864,655 (2022 est.)
47,564,296 (2019 census )

Age structure
0-14 years: 38.71% (male 10,412,321/female 10,310,908)
15-24 years: 20.45% (male 5,486,641/female 5,460,372)
25-54 years: 33.75% (male 9,046,946/female 9,021,207)
55-64 years: 4.01% (male 1,053,202/female 1,093,305)
65 years and over: 3.07% (2020 est.) (male 750,988/female 892,046)

0-14 years: 39.03% (male 9,474,968 /female 9,416,609)
15-24 years: 19.61% (male 4,737,647 /female 4,752,896)
25-54 years: 34.27% (male 8,393,673 /female 8,193,800)
55-64 years: 4% (male 894,371 /female 1,040,883)
65 years and over: 3.08% (male 640,005 /female 852,675) (2019 est.)

Population growth rate
2.12% (2022 est.) Country comparison to the world: 38th
1.57% (2018 est.) Country comparison to the world: 67th

Birth rate
26.39 births/1,000 population (2022 est.) Country comparison to the world: 43rd
22.6 births/1,000 population (2018 est.) Country comparison to the world: 66th

Death rate
5.01 deaths/1,000 population (2022 est.) Country comparison to the world: 196th
6.7 deaths/1,000 population (2018 est.) Country comparison to the world: 137th

Total fertility rate
3.29 children born/woman (2022 est.) Country comparison to the world: 44th
2.81 children born/woman (2018 est.) Country comparison to the world: 59th

Median age
total: 20 years. Country comparison to the world: 195th
male: 19.9 years
female: 20.1 years (2020 est.)

total: 20 years. Country comparison to the world: 191st
male: 19.9 years 
female: 20.2 years (2018 est.)

Mother's mean age at first birth
20.3 years (2014 est.)
note: median age at first birth among women 25-29

Contraceptive prevalence rate
59.7% (2019)
61.6% (2016)

Net migration rate
-0.19 migrant(s)/1,000 population (2022 est.) Country comparison to the world: 111st
-0.2 migrant(s)/1,000 population (2017 est.) Country comparison to the world: 109th

Dependency ratios
total dependency ratio: 78.3 (2015 est.)
youth dependency ratio: 73.7 (2015 est.)
elderly dependency ratio: 4.6 (2015 est.)
potential support ratio: 21.7 (2015 est.)

Urbanization

urban population: 29% of total population (2022)
rate of urbanization: 4.09% annual rate of change (2020-25 est.)

urban population: 27% of total population (2018)
rate of urbanization: 4.23% annual rate of change (2015-20 est.)

Life expectancy at birth
total population: 69.69 years. Country comparison to the world: 175th
male: 67.98 years
female: 71.43 years (2022 est.)

total population: 64.6 years (2018 est.)
male: 63.1 years (2018 est.)
female: 66.1 years (2018 est.)

Education expenditures
5.1% of GDP (2020) Country comparison to the world: 60th

Literacy
definition: age 15 and over can read and write (2015 est.)
total population: 81.5%
male: 85%
female: 78.2% (2018)

total population: 78% (2015 est.)
male: 81.1% (2015 est.)
female: 74.9% (2015 est.)

School life expectancy (primary to tertiary education)
total: 5 years (1970) to 11 years (2009)
male: 11 years (2009)
female: 11 years (2009)

Health

Like the demographics of Africa in general, Kenya is plagued by high infant mortality, low life expectancy, malnourishment (32% of population) and HIV/AIDS.
While these concerns remain grave, a trend towards improvement is reported in the period of 2006 to 2010: Infant mortality was at estimated at 59.26 deaths/1,000 live births as of 2006, decreasing to 54.7 deaths/1,000 live births as of 2010.
Life expectancy was estimated at 48.9 years as of 2006, and has risen to 64 years in 2012.

According to 2008–09 Kenyan government survey, total fertility was 4.6, contraception usage among married women was 46 percent.
Total fertility rate has decreased 4.91 children per woman (2006 estimate), to 4.38 (2010 estimate).
Literacy (age 7 and over) was estimated at 85.1% in 2003 (male: 90.6%, female: 79.7%).

Major infectious diseases
degree of risk: very high (2020)
food or waterborne diseases: bacterial and protozoal diarrhea, hepatitis A, and typhoid fever
vectorborne diseases: malaria, dengue fever, and Rift Valley fever
water contact diseases: schistosomiasis
animal contact diseases: rabies

Religion

CIA World Factbook estimate:

Christian 85.5%
Protestant 33.4%
Roman Catholic 20.6%
Evangelical 20.4%
African Instituted Churches 7%
Other Christian 4.1%
Islam 10.9%
Other 1.8%
None 1.6%
Unspecified 0.2%

See also
Geography of Kenya

References

Attribution:

Further reading

)

External links

Population and Housing Census – Ethnic Affiliation